Michael Frederick Lockwood (born 6 February 1959) is a British civil servant who has served in local government and as inaugural director general of the Independent Office for Police Conduct (IOPC), the policing watchdog for England and Wales.

Career
Lockwood was the CEO of Harrow London Borough Council from 2007 until the end of 2013, when the position was eliminated, and again from 2015 after it was reinstituted. In the interim, he was executive director of finance and policy at the Local Government Association. After the 2017 Grenfell Tower fire, he led recovery work and liaised with survivors and victims' families. The Grenfell Tower Memorial Commission chose him as co-chair in early 2020. 

He was appointed to head the IOPC at its inception in 2018. As Director General, Lockwood also chaired the IOPC Board, the majority of which is made up of Non-Executive Directors. The Board advises the Director General and with him sets the strategy for the organisation. In October 2019 Lockwood published an op-ed in The Guardian, defending an investigation his organization had performed into the case of an alleged VIP paedophile ring. He resigned as Director General on 3 December 2022 after he became the subject of a police investigation.

References

Living people
1959 births
English nonprofit executives
21st-century English businesspeople
Local government officers in England